Idyashbash (İźäşbaş) is a rural locality (a village) in Sabayevsky Selsoviet, Buzdyaksky District, Bashkortostan, Russia. The population was 154 as of 2010. There are 2 streets.

Geography 
Idyashbash is located 46 km northwest of Buzdyak (the district's administrative centre) by road. Tugayevo is the nearest rural locality.

References 

Rural localities in Buzdyaksky District